Howard K. "Butch" Komives (May 9, 1941 – March 22, 2009) was an American professional basketball player who spent ten seasons in the National Basketball Association (NBA) with the New York Knicks, Detroit Pistons, Buffalo Braves and Kansas City-Omaha Kings.

Born in Toledo, Ohio, he graduated from Woodward High School (Toledo) in 1960.

College career
Komives played college basketball at Bowling Green State University (BGSU), where he led the team in scoring in each of his three varsity seasons. As a starting shooting guard, he teamed with Nate Thurmond, the school's all-time leading rebounder, to lead the Falcons to back-to-back Mid-American Conference (MAC) championships and NCAA tournament appearances in 1962 and 1963.

Despite Thurmond's graduation and the team's fall to third place in the conference, Komives led the National Collegiate Athletic Association (NCAA) in scoring during the 1963–64 season with 36.7 points per game, still BGSU and MAC records. Even though he no longer is the school's all-time leading scorer (his 1,834 total points is currently third), his 25.8 scoring average is still a Falcons record. Komives still holds the Bowling Green single game scoring record of sixty six points.  In this game, he was guarded by Sumner Goldstein, who would later go on to become an attorney. 

He was inducted into the BGSU Athletics Hall of Fame in 1970. His son Shane was a four-year basketball letterman at the same school from 1993 to 1996.

Professional career
Komives was selected thirteenth overall in the second round by the New York Knicks in the 1964 NBA draft. He was named to the All-Rookie Team in 1965, after starting in every regular-season match and averaging 12.2 points per game. After the Knicks acquired Dick Barnett prior to the 1965–66 season, Komives was shifted to point guard, a position with which he struggled, drawing the wrath of Knicks fans. The most productive campaign of his professional career was in 1967, when his averages per contest were 15.7 points and 6.2 assists.

By the time Red Holzman became the Knicks' coach midway through the 1967–68 season, Komives was involved in a personal feud with Cazzie Russell that negatively affected the rest of the team. Russell was an ardent supporter of Richard Nixon in the 1968 Presidential election, while Komives worked for the Hubert Humphrey campaign. With the emergence of Walt Frazier as the starting point guard, Komives was traded along with Walt Bellamy to the Pistons for Dave DeBusschere on December 19, 1968. DeBusschere would become the last major addition to the Knicks before it won its first NBA Championship in 1970.

In 2007, Komives was inducted into the Ohio Basketball Hall of Fame.

Komives died at University of Toledo Medical Center on March 22, 2009 at age 67. His wife Marcia had found him unconscious and unresponsive in their home three days earlier.

References

External links
 Howard Komives bio and stats at Hoops Analyst website
 Howard Komives NBA career stats
 Howard Komives biography at Ohio Hoop Zone website
 "Howard 'Butch' Komives, 1941–2009: Woodward basketball star excelled for BGSU," The Blade (Toledo, Ohio), Monday, March 23, 2009.
 Hackenberg, Dave. "Komives was Woodward, BGSU basketball legend," The Blade (Toledo, Ohio), Monday, March 23, 2009.
 "Falcon cage standout Komives died in Toledo," Sentinel-Tribune (Bowling Green, Ohio), Monday, March 23, 2009.

1941 births
2009 deaths
All-American college men's basketball players
American men's basketball players
Basketball players from Ohio
Bowling Green Falcons men's basketball players
Buffalo Braves players
Continental Basketball Association coaches
Detroit Pistons players
Kansas City Kings players
New York Knicks draft picks
New York Knicks players
Point guards
Sportspeople from Toledo, Ohio